Avec le cœur is a R&B, hip hop and soul French double album, written and performed by French-Algerian singer Kenza Farah. The album, her second studio album, contains 22 tracks and guest appearances with the Psy 4 De La Rime, Nina Sky, Roldan group Orishas and Busy Signal. It was released 17 November 2008 in France.

Track listing

CD1

"Avec le cœur"
"Au cœur de la rue"
"Mi corazon"
"Peuple du monde entier"
"Je représente"
"Désillusion du ghetto"
"On tient le coup" feat. Psy 4 de la Rime 
"Let Me Be With You''
"La nuit" feat. Busy Signal
"Ce que je suis"
"Que serais-je?"

CD2

"Kenza sur le beat"
"J'essaie encore"
"J'aurais voulu te dire"
"Chant libre"
"Ne nous jugez pas" feat. Roldán
"Commandement du ciment"
"Toute seule"
"Tout ça ne compte pas"
"Celle qu'il te faut" feat. Nina Sky
"La vérité"
"Pardonnez moi"

Charts

Weekly charts

Year-end charts

References

2008 albums
French-language albums
Kenza Farah albums